The Scie is a river that flows from the plateau of the southern Pays de Caux in the Seine-Maritime département of Normandy into the English Channel.

The river rises at Saint-Victor-l'Abbaye and passes through Auffay, Saint-Maclou-de-Folleville, Longueville-sur-Scie, Anneville-sur-Scie, Heugleville-sur-Scie, Saint-Aubin-sur-Scie and finally Hautot-sur-Mer.

Economy 
In the past, the river was host to 43 watermills that powered machinery to process wheat, cotton, tannin and flax for linen. Two mills still exist today, at Saint-Maclou-de-Folleville (the moulin  of Arbalète) and at Auffay. Today, the activities of the valley includes the production of apples and cider.

See also 
French water management scheme

References

Scie
Scie
Rivers of Seine-Maritime
0Scie